Olga Borisovna Bogaevskaya (25 October 1915, Petrograd, Russian Empire – 30 November 2000, Saint Petersburg, Russia) was a Russian Soviet painter and graphic artist, who lived and worked in Saint Petersburg - Petrograd - Leningrad. She was a member of the Leningrad Union of Artists, regarded as one of the leading representatives of the Leningrad School of painting.

Biography
Bogaevskaya was born October 25, 1915, in Petrograd in the family of scientist, archaeologist, and art historian. She studied at the Art and Industry College, where she was a student of Dmitry Zagoskin (1931–1932). Then continued education in the Leningrad Institute of Painting, Sculpture and Architecture, where she was a student of Sergei Priselkov, Genrikh Pavlovsky, David Bernshtein, and Alexander Osmerkin (1933–1940). In 1940 Bogaevskaya graduated from the Institute of Painting, Sculpture and Architecture in Alexander Osmerkin workshop with the rank of artist of painting. Her degree work was the painting "Meting of girlfriend".

In 1940 Bogaevskaya married a fellow student at the institute artist Gleb Savinov. In 1940–1941, she taught painting at the Secondary Art School at the Leningrad Institute of Painting, Sculpture and Architecture. Bogaevskaya was a regular participant of exhibitions of Leningrad artists since the late 1940s. She was a talented colorist. The leading theme of her work - child portrait, still life in the interior and exterior. Since 1940 Bogaevskaya was a member of the Leningrad Union of Soviet Artists. Works of 1950–1960s nominated her of the leading painters of Leningrad.

Among Bogaevskaya's most famous works are paintings "The Breakfast", "Cadets" (both 1947), "Peaceful sleep" (1951), "Still Life with Strawberries", "Girls", "Flowers. Still life" (all 1956), "In the garden", "Girl with Dolls" (both 1957), "Guests", "Apples" (both 1960), "Still life", "Snowdrops" (both 1961) "Wedding" (1967), "Still Life with Tray", "Roses" (both 1972), "Katia with the Doll", "Still life with a Bird" (both 1976), "Children's Holiday" (1980), "A Spring" (1990).

Bogaevskaya died on 30 November 2000 in Saint Petersburg at the age of eighty-six. Her paintings reside in State Russian Museum in Saint Petersburg, in museums and private collections in Russia, Italy, Britain, France, in the U.S., Japan, and other countries.

See also
Leningrad School of Painting
List of Russian artists
List of 20th-century Russian painters
List of painters of Saint Petersburg Union of Artists
List of the Russian Landscape painters
Saint Petersburg Union of Artists

References

Bibliography
Выставка произведений ленинградских художников 1951 года. Каталог. Л., Лениздат, 1951. С.8.
Осенняя выставка произведений ленинградских художников 1956 года. Каталог. Л., Ленинградский художник, 1958. С.7.
1917 — 1957. Выставка произведений ленинградских художников. Каталог. Л., Ленинградский художник, 1958. С.9.
Выставка произведений ленинградских художников 1960 года. Каталог. Л., Художник РСФСР, 1963. С.7.
Выставка произведений ленинградских художников 1960 года. Каталог. Л., Художник РСФСР, 1961. С.10.
Республиканская художественная выставка «Советская Россия». Каталог. М., Советский художник, 1960. С.17.
Выставка произведений ленинградских художников 1961 года. Каталог. Л., Художник РСФСР, 1964. С.10.
Ленинград. Зональная выставка 1964 года. Каталог. Л, Художник РСФСР, 1965. C.11.
Каталог весенней выставки произведений ленинградских художников 1965 года. Л., Художник РСФСР, 1970. С.9.
Вторая республиканская художественная выставка «Советская Россия». Каталог. М., Советский художник, 1965. С.12.
Третья республиканская художественная выставка «Советская Россия». Каталог. М., Министерство культуры РСФСР, 1967. С.19.
Наш современник. Каталог выставки произведений ленинградских художников 1971 года. Л., Художник РСФСР, 1972. С.9.
По родной стране. Выставка произведений художников Ленинграда. 50-Летию образования СССР посвящается. Каталог. Л., Художник РСФСР, 1974. С.10.
Наш современник. Зональная выставка произведений ленинградских художников 1975 года. Каталог. Л., Художник РСФСР, 1980. C.12.
Изобразительное искусство Ленинграда. Каталог выставки. Л., Художник РСФСР, 1976. C.15.
Выставка произведений ленинградских художников, посвящённая 60-летию Великого Октября. Л., Художник РСФСР, 1982. С.12.
Зональная выставка произведений ленинградских художников 1980 года. Каталог. Л., Художник РСФСР, 1983. C.10.
Directory of members of the Leningrad branch of Union of Artists of Russian Federation. Leningrad, Khudozhnik RSFSR, 1987. P.15.
L' École de Leningrad. Auction Catalogue. Paris, Drouot Richelieu, 21 Decembre 1990. P.58-59.
Olga Borisovna Bogaevskaya. Torino, Galleria PIRRA, 1996.
Link of Times: 1932 - 1997. Artists - Members of Saint Petersburg Union of Artists of Russia. Exhibition catalogue. Saint Petersburg, Manezh Central Exhibition Hall, 1997. P.283-284.
Matthew C. Bown. Dictionary of 20th Century Russian and Soviet Painters 1900-1980s. London, Izomar, 1998. , .
Time for change. The Art of 1960-1985 in the Soviet Union. Saint Petersburg, State Russian Museum, 2006. P.170.
Sergei V. Ivanov. Unknown Socialist Realism. The Leningrad School. Saint Petersburg, NP-Print Edition, 2007. P.9, 15, 20, 21, 24, 385, 387–393, 395, 397, 399–402, 405, 407, 439, 445. , .
Anniversary Directory graduates of Saint Petersburg State Academic Institute of Painting, Sculpture, and Architecture named after Ilya Repin, Russian Academy of Arts. 1915 - 2005. Saint Petersburg, Pervotsvet Publishing House, 2007. P.43-46, 48.  .

External links 

 Artist Olga Bogaevskaya in ARKA Fine Art Gallery

1915 births
2000 deaths
Painters from Saint Petersburg
People from Sankt-Peterburgsky Uyezd
20th-century Russian painters
Soviet painters
Socialist realist artists
Leningrad School artists
Russian women painters
20th-century Russian women artists
Repin Institute of Arts alumni
Members of the Leningrad Union of Artists